Henry Clark Corbin (September 15, 1842 – September 8, 1909) was an officer in the United States Army who served as Adjutant General of the U.S. Army from 1898 to 1904.

Life and career
He was born in Monroe Township, Clermont County, Ohio, He was educated at the Clermont Academy. Corbin was teaching school and studying law when the American Civil War broke out. Corbin volunteered as a second lieutenant in the 83rd Ohio Infantry in July 1862 and transferred to the 79th Ohio Infantry the next month. In November 1863 he was commissioned a major in the 14th United States Colored Infantry. He eventually rose to be lieutenant colonel and colonel of this regiment, and participated in the Battle of Decatur and Battle of Nashville. He was mustered out in March 1866.

After the war, he became a First Class Companion of the Military Order of the Loyal Legion of the United States, a military society composed of Union officers and their descendants.

In May 1866 he was commissioned a second lieutenant in the 17th Infantry of the Regular Army. He was promoted to captain in the 38th Infantry, a Buffalo Soldier regiment, in July 1866.  The 38th Infantry was consolidated with the 41st Infantry to form the 24th Infantry in November 1869.

Corbin was appointed to the official staff of President Rutherford B. Hayes, serving at the White House from 1877 to 1881. He was attending Hayes' successor, James A. Garfield, when Garfield was shot in 1881, and was present at his death in Elberon, New Jersey. He became a major in the Adjutant General's Department in June 1880, serving in the Department of the South and the Department of the Missouri. He was promoted to lieutenant colonel in June 1889, serving in the Department of Arizona, the Adjutant General's Office in Washington, and the Department of the East. In May 1896 he returned to the Adjutant General's Department in Washington as a colonel.

He was elevated to Adjutant General of the U. S. Army with the rank of brigadier general in February 1898. He was promoted to major general in June 1900. He took command of the newly created Division of the Atlantic in January 1904, then was given command of the Division of the Philippines in November 1904. He took command of the Northern Division in February 1906 and was promoted to lieutenant general in April 1906, making him the senior ranking officer on active duty in the U.S. Army. He retired in September 1906, and died in September 1909 in Washington, D.C. He is buried in Arlington National Cemetery.

His portrait was painted at least twice by the Swiss-born American artist Adolfo Müller-Ury, once in 1899, and again in 1904, the latter of which was donated by Mrs Edythe Patten Corbin to the National Collection of Fine Arts, Smithsonian Institution, Washington D.C. in 1941, transferred to National Portrait Gallery in 1971.

Military awards
Civil War Campaign Medal
Indian Campaign Medal
Spanish War Service Medal
Philippine Campaign Medal

See also
 List of Adjutant Generals of the U.S. Army

References

Further reading

External links

 Arlington National Cemetery
 

1842 births
1909 deaths
Adjutants general of the United States Army
American military personnel of the Spanish–American War
Burials at Arlington National Cemetery
People from Clermont County, Ohio
People of Ohio in the American Civil War
Union Army officers
United States Army generals